Van der Velden is a Dutch toponymic surname meaning "from the fields". In 2007, there were over 10,000 people with this name in The Netherlands.   Among variations on this name are Vandervelden (primarily in Belgium), Vander Velden,  Van de Velden,  Van den Velden, Van der Velde, Van de Velde, Vandervelde, Vandevelde, and Van Velden. Notable people with the surname include:

Arie van der Velden (1881–1967), Dutch competitive sailor
Audrey Vandervelden (born 1954), Canadian volleyball player
Bianca van der Velden (born 1976), Dutch synchronized swimmer
Brooke van Velden, New Zealand politician
Eline Van der Velden (born 1986), Dutch comedian, writer, actress and producer in England
Hugo van der Velden (born 1963), Dutch art historian
Johannes Joseph van der Velden (1891–1954), German Catholic theologian and Bishop of Aachen
Junior van der Velden (born 1998), Dutch football defender
Logan Vander Velden (born 1971), American basketball player
Marly van der Velden (born 1988), Dutch actor and fashion designer
Mieneke van der Velden (born 1962), Dutch gambist (viola de gamba player)
Monique van der Velden (born 1973), Dutch figure skater
Nick van der Velden (born 1981), Dutch football midfielder
Niek van der Velden (born 2000), Dutch snowboarder
Nicole van der Velden (born 1994), Aruban competitive sailor
Petrus Van der Velden (1837–1913), Dutch painter who emigrated to New Zealand in 1890
Piet van der Velden (1899–1975), Dutch water polo player
Sonja van der Velden (born 1976), Dutch synchronized swimmer

See also
14664 Vandervelden, main-belt asteroid named after Erwin Rene van der Velden, Australian astrophotographer

References

Dutch-language surnames
Dutch toponymic surnames

de:Van der Velden